Lewis Lawrence Pope (February 18, 1908 – February 5, 1964) was an American football player.

He was born in 1908 in Hobart, Oklahoma. 

He played college football as a halfback for Purdue University in 1929 and 1930 and professional football in the National Football League (NFL) as a halfback for the Providence Steam Roller in 1931 and for the Cincinnati Reds in 1933 and 1934. He appeared in 26 NFL games, 18 as a starter, tallying 342 rushing yards, 230 passing yards, 37 receiving yards. He ran 48 yards for a game-winning touchdown against the Chicago Cardinals on November 12, 1933. 

After retiring from football he lived for a time in Los Angeles and later in Frederick, Oklahoma. He died in 1964 at age 55 and was buried at the Hobart Rose Cemetery in Hobart, Oklahoma.

References

1908 births
1964 deaths
Purdue Boilermakers football players
Providence Steam Roller players
Cincinnati Reds (NFL) players
Players of American football from Oklahoma
People from Hobart, Oklahoma